The Hampton Pirates men's lacrosse team represents Hampton University in college lacrosse. The Pirates' program was announced on May 5, 2015 and they first competed on February 13, 2016. On August 20, 2020, Woodson was named head coach of the Hampton Pirates Men’s Lacrosse team.

Hampton has accepted an invitation to join the Colonial Athletic Association.

History

Season Results
The following is a list of the Hampton results by season as an NCAA Division I program:

{| class="wikitable"

|- align="center"

†NCAA canceled 2020 collegiate activities due to the COVID-19 virus.

References

External links
 Official website

College men's lacrosse teams in the United States